The College Cup Most Outstanding Player may refer to:

 NCAA Division I Men's Soccer Tournament Most Outstanding Player
 NCAA Division I Women's Soccer Tournament Most Outstanding Player

See also
College Cup